Mike Gray (born February 11, 1960) is a former award-winning and all-star Canadian Football League defensive tackle and Grey Cup champion.

After playing his college football at the University of Oregon Gray started his pro career with the British Columbia Lions in 1985. He played 16 games and had 13 sacks, good for an all-star nod and the CFL's Most Outstanding Rookie Award. After 8 sacks in 1986, the Lions lost Gray to the Ottawa Rough Riders in the equalization draft. Ottawa released him and he began a 7-year stay with the Winnipeg Blue Bombers, playing 107 regular season games and being named an Eastern all-star in 1989.

Perhaps Gray's most famous and dramatic play came in the classic 76th Grey Cup game. Facing his old team, the B.C. Lions, Winnipeg had their backs to the wall, leading by only 3 points in the final minute of the game, with the Lions on the Bomber 7 yard line. Matt Dunigan's pass was tipped at the line of scrimmage and somehow Gray came up with the Cup-saving interception, earning him the defensive Grey Cup Most Valuable Player award.

In 1994 Gray was an assistant coach with the Lions.

In October 2018, he became the defensive line coach for the Salt Lake Stallions of the Alliance of American Football.

References

1960 births
Living people
African-American players of Canadian football
BC Lions players
Canadian Football League Rookie of the Year Award winners
Oregon Ducks football players
Sportspeople from Baltimore
Winnipeg Blue Bombers players
Players of American football from Maryland
Salt Lake Stallions coaches
21st-century African-American people
20th-century African-American sportspeople